Arturo Ardao (Minas, Lavalleja, 27 September 1912 – Montevideo, 22 September 2003) was a Uruguayan philosopher and historian of ideas.

From 1968 to 1972 he was dean of the Faculty of Humanities. Before the Military Coup in 1973, he was forced into exile in Venezuela, where he continued his academic activity as professor at the  Simón Bolívar University in Caracas . In addition, he participates as researcher at the Center for Latin American Studies Rómulo Gallegos.

He contributed to the weekly newspaper Marcha.

Works
1937, Vida de Basilio Muñoz (with Julio Castro. Montevideo)
1945, Filosofía pre-universitaria en el Uruguay (Montevideo)
Espiritualismo y positivismo (México. 1950)
1951, Batlle y Ordóñez y el positivismo filosófico (Número, Montevideo)
1956, La filosofía del Uruguay del siglo XX (México)
1962, Racionalismo y Liberalismo en el Uruguay (Montevideo)
1962, La filosofía polémica de Feijóo. (Buenos Aires)
1963, Filosofía en lengua española (Montevideo)
1971, Etapas de la inteligencia uruguaya (Montevideo)
1976, Espacio e Inteligencia (Caracas)
1980, Génesis de la idea y el nombre de América Latina (Caracas)
1991, La inteligencia latinoamericana (Montevideo)
1992, España en el origen del nombre América Latina (Montevideo)
1997, Lógica y metafísica en Feijóo (Montevideo)
2000, La lógica de la razón y la lógica de la inteligencia (Montevideo)
Feijóo, Fundador de la Filosofía de lengua española.

References

External links
Arturo Ardao.
Biblioteca Virtual Ignacio Larramendi - Colección de Polígrafos Hispanoamericanos - Arturo Ardao.
 Proyecto Ensayo Hispánico Homenaje a Arturo Roig y Arturo Ardao, Edward Demenchónok

1912 births
2003 deaths
People from Minas, Uruguay
Uruguayan philosophers
20th-century Uruguayan historians
Intellectual historians
Uruguayan essayists
Historians of philosophy
20th-century philosophers
20th-century essayists
Uruguayan expatriates in Venezuela
20th-century Uruguayan male writers